Kim Jong-min (born 12 May 1964) is a South Korean politician representing South Chungcheong Province's three districts - Nonsan city, Gyeryong city and Geumsan county - at the National Assembly from 2016.

Before entering politics 
Kim studied Korean Language and Literature at Seoul National University. After graduating college, Kim worked as a political journalist for newspapers - daily Naeil and weekly Sisajournal during which he met then-presidential hopeful Roh Moo-hyun.

Early political career 
Kim first joined politics in 2003 when he started working as one of administrators at Office of senior secretary for public affairs to the President Roh. He continued working for Roh until the end of Roh's term. In 2004 he was promoted to vice presidential spokesperson and a month later to the Roh's third presidential spokesperson becoming the youngest person to assume this post at the age of 40. Kim was Roh's first spokesperson after Roh returned to the office following Constitutional Court's ruling which turned down his impeachment voted by the parliament. In 2005 he was reshuffled to secretary for public affairs and served till the end of Roh's presidency in 2008. After serving at the Blue House for the entire Roh's presidency of five years, Kim joined in developing and running the online debate platform of Roh's supporters, "Democracy 2.0" which operated only for a short period due to Roh's suicide.

He later joined Ahn Hee-jung, then-elected governor of South Chungcheong Province, whom he first met at university as his first deputy. He resigned from the post for the 2012 general election.

National Assembly member 
In 2016 general election, Kim defeated a six-term parliamentarian, former presidential candidate with a nickname "phoenix" Lee In-je who defeated Kim in the previous 2012 election. Since then he took multiple roles in his party such as vice chair of its Policy Planning Committee from 2015 to 2017 and deputy floor leader from 2018 to 2019.

In July 2020 he announced his campaign to become one of five elected members of his party's Supreme Council. In August 2020 he was elected as Supreme Council member for the fixed term of two years receiving the most votes from party members among 8 candidates.

From September 2020 Kim chairs party's task force for reforming "power institutions" such as prosecution, police and intelligence agencies and from October 2020 its committee to reform the party itself.

Electoral history

Awards 

  Order of Service Merit by the government of South Korea (2006)

References 

Living people
1964 births
People from Nonsan
Seoul National University alumni
Minjoo Party of Korea politicians
Members of the National Assembly (South Korea)